Louisa Edwards (born Mary Louisa Edwards on November 4, 1979) is an American author of contemporary romance novels. Before becoming a novelist, she was a book editor and restaurant reviewer, and her novels incorporate her love of food with their focus on chefs at high-class restaurants. Edwards also writes the Sanctuary Island series under the name Lily Everett. Edwards lives in Austin, Texas, with her husband, Nicholas White, the founder of the online news site, The Daily Dot.

Bibliography

As Lily Everett
 Sanctuary Island, St. Martin's Press, 2013
 Shoreline Drive, St. Martin's Press, 2014
 Homecoming, St. Martin's Press, 2014
 Heartbreak Cove, St. Martin's Press, 2015
 Home For Christmas, St. Martin's Press, 2015
 Three Promises, St. Martin's Press, 2016

As Louisa Edwards
 Can’t Stand the Heat, St. Martin’s Press, 2009
 On the Steamy Side, St. Martin’s Press, 2010
 Just One Taste, St. Martin’s Press, 2010
 Too Hot to Touch, St. Martin’s Press, 2011
 Some Like It Hot, St. Martin’s Press, 2011
 Hot Under Pressure, St. Martin’s Press, 2012

References

External links

Publisher's Author Page

Living people
American romantic fiction writers
1979 births